Unashamed is a 1932 American pre-Code crime drama film directed by Harry Beaumont, written by Bayard Veiller and starring Helen Twelvetrees, Robert Young, Lewis Stone, Jean Hersholt, John Miljan and Monroe Owsley. It was released on July 2, 1932 by Metro-Goldwyn-Mayer.

The film, as well as the same year's Two Against the World, is based on a Philadelphia society "honor killing" committed by Eddie Allen.

Plot

Cast 
 Helen Twelvetrees as Joan Ogden
 Robert Young as Dick Ogden
 Lewis Stone as Henry Trask
 Jean Hersholt as Heinrich Schmidt
 John Miljan as District Attorney Harris
 Monroe Owsley as Harry Swift
 Robert Warwick as Mr. Ogden
 Gertrude Michael as Marjorie
 Wilfrid North as Judge Ambrose 
 Thomas E. Jackson as Captain Timothy Riorden 
 Louise Beavers as Amanda Jones
 Herman Bing as Hans (unaccredited)

Reception
Toronto's The Globe noted that the film "wove many new and modern angles into a strange gripping story."

The Spokesman-Review noted that Twelvetrees was given "a role that fits her well" after "ups and downs," and "the result is a picture of good entertainment value. Young is also a capable actor and gives Miss Twelvetrees adequate support."

References

External links
 
 
 
 
 "Honor slaying inspires 1932 movies", immortalephemera.com
 Unashamed (film profile #1) via google.com
 Unashamed (film profile #2) via google.com

1932 films
American crime drama films
1932 crime drama films
Metro-Goldwyn-Mayer films
Films directed by Harry Beaumont
American black-and-white films
1930s English-language films
1930s American films